Mbarara City is a city in the Western Region of Uganda and the second largest city in Uganda after Kampala. The city is divided into 6 boroughs of Kakoba Division, Kamukuzi Division, Nyamitanga Division, Biharwe Division, Kakiika Division, Nyakayojo Division. It is the main commercial centre of most of south western districts of Uganda and the site of the district headquarters. In May 2019, the Uganda's cabinet granted Mbarara a city status, which started on 1 July 2020.

Location
Mbarara is an important transport hub, lying west of Masaka on the road to Kabale, near Lake Mburo National Park. The coordinates of the Mbarara central business district are 00 36 48S, 30 39 30E (Latitude:-0.6132; Longitude:30.6582).

City Wards
The city has a total of 23 wards spread across 6 divisions and 2 constituencies

Population
In 2002, the national census estimated the population of the town at 69,400. The Uganda Bureau of Statistics (UBOS) estimated the population at 82,000 in 2010. In 2011, UBOS estimated the mid-year population at 83,700. In August 2014, the national population census put the population at 195,013.

Climate
Between the driest and wettest months, the difference in precipitation is 94 mm | 4 inch. The variation in annual temperature is around 2.4 °C | 4.3 °F. The month with the highest relative humidity is November (76.93%). The month with the lowest relative humidity is July (53.76%). The month with the highest number of rainy days is October (22.37 days). The month with the lowest number of rainy days is July (3.67 days). Mbarara is in the middle and the summers are that easy to define.

Growth and expansion

Mbarara came from behind and developed to surpass Entebbe, Masaka, Gulu, and Jinja. As of 2014, Mbarara was the second-largest city in Uganda after Kampala and also second to Kampala in importance, industry, and infrastructure.

Starting with 2000, modern buildings have been established including malls, arcades, plaza, and hotels. Modern hospitals have also been constructed including Mbarara Hospital, which is now a Regional Referral Hospital, Mbarara Community Hospital, a private hospital located in Kyamugorani, Kakiika Division, and Mayanja Memorial Hospital, located in Nyamityobora Kakoba Division.

Infrastructure
Mbarara is the home of Mbarara University of Science & Technology (MUST), founded in 1989.

With significance for all Ugandan cities, Mbarara was the host to the 2004 Annual General Meeting of the Uganda Local Governments Association on 1 October, which saw the changing of the organisation to its current structure in order to represent all Ugandan local governments. Mbarara remains an active member of this governmental association.

Water supply
Due to a rapidly expanding population, the current water supply from nearby River Rwizi is insufficient to meet the future needs of Mbarara City. The Ugandan government has borrowed €120 million to source water from the Kagera River purify it and pump it to Mbarara, Masaka and Isingiro District.

Mbarara Bypass Road

As part of the modernisation of the Mbarara-Katuna Road (2011 - 2015), a new northern bypass road is planned for the town. The bypass is expected to decongest the city centre by taking the long-distance trucks destined for and coming from Rwanda, Burundi, and the Democratic Republic of the Congo off of Mbarara's city streets. The  road is expected to cost about €170 million (US$210 million), of which the European Union is expected to lend about €122 million (US$153 million) with the government funding the balance from its own resources.

Points of interest
The following additional points of interest lie within the city limits or close to its edges:

Administration
 Offices of Mbarara City Council

Industry
 Nile Breweries Mbarara - A subsidiary of Anheuser-Busch InBev
Century Bottling Company Limited, Mbarara - Manufacturer and distributor of Coca-Cola products

 Mbarara Steel Plant - Owned and operated by the China Machine Building International Corporation (CMIC), a Chinese Government parastal company
 Roofings Uganda limited.
 Lato Milk - a dairy product manufacturing company founded by Pearl Dairy Farms Limited
 Ntake bakery and company Limited, Mbarara

Social services
 Mbarara Regional Referral Hospital: A 600-bed, public hospital, administered by the Uganda Ministry of Health. The teaching hospital of Mbarara University School of Medicine
 Mbarara Community Hospital: A private hospital that serves the community without regard to ability to pay.
 Mayanja Memorial Hospital: A private 100-bed hospital
 Holy Innocents Children's Hospital: A private 100-bed general pediatric hospital, administered by the Roman Catholic Archdiocese of Mbarara

Education
 Mbarara University of Science and Technology - one of the nine public universities in Uganda
 Makerere University Business School Mbarara Regional Campus 
 Uganda Bible Institute
 The Mbarara Campus of Uganda Martyrs University
 The Western Campus of Uganda Management Institute
 Bishop Stuart University - a private Christian University, affiliated with the Church of Uganda located in Kakoba division (Makerere University, Kikara campus)
 Ntare School - a boys-only boarding middle and high school
 Mbarara High School - an Anglican-Church of Uganda-based residential boys-only middle and high school located at Ruharo Cathedral and is a government-aided school
 Maryhill High School- a girls-only boarding middle and high school founded by the Daughters of Mary and government aided

Transport
 Mbarara Northern Bypass Road - A  bypass road, circling the northern half of the city. Constructed between March 2015 and June 2018.

See also
Ankole sub-region
List of cities and towns in Uganda
 Ray G
 Robert Mwesigwa

References

External links

Mbarara University Homepage
Britannica Online Article About Mbarara
Nile Breweries Raises Tetchy Land Question Over Mbarara Project
Agandi Portal- A city web portal for Mbarara
Mbarara News website
Downtown Mbarara
The Ankole Times

 
Mbarara District
Populated places in Western Region, Uganda
Cities in the Great Rift Valley